Teshio Mountains (天塩山地 Teshio-sanchi) is a mountain range of Hokkaidō, Japan.

Mountains
 Mount Pisshiri
 Mount Santō

References
 Geographical Survey Institute

Mountain ranges of Hokkaido